The Quest: The Longest Drive is a 1976 American television film.

Cast
Kurt Russell as Morgan Bodeen
Tim Matheson as Quinton Bodeen
Richard Egan as Captain Wilson
Joaquin Garay III as Little Eagle
Susan Dey as Charlotte Ross
Bill Fletcher as Sergeant Yoelker
Christopher Connelly as Corporal Callender
Charles Lindsay Workman as Colonel Porter

External links
 

1976 films
1976 television films
Films directed by Lee H. Katzin
1970s English-language films